Hara is a Romanian pop-rock band from Cluj-Napoca. Its members during 2000–2002 were: Flavius Buzilă, Mihai Pop, Nicu Lichirie, Tudor Runcanu and Doru Dejeu. Since 2003 the members are: Flavius Buzilă, Mihai Pop, Nicu Lichirie, Marius Astilean and Vasi Nani.

History
Hara's current members are:

 Flavius Buzila – vocals, guitar
 Mihai Andritcu – violin
 Radu Anghel  – bass
 Valentin Musat – guitar
 Nunu Racris – drums

Discography
Aiurea (2001)
Mai frumoasă (2003)
O zi (2004)
Paișpe colinde și o strigătură (2006)
Interetnik (2008)

Romanian pop music groups